Events from the year 1711 in Russia

Incumbents 

 Monarch - Peter I

Events 

 Pruth River Campaign
 Establishment of the Arsenal Design Bureau
 Establishment of Dmitrovsk
 Establishment of the Governing Senate

Births 

 Stepan Krasheninnikov
 Mikhail Lomonosov

Deaths 

1711 in Russia
Years of the 18th century in Russia